U.S. Naval Base Australia comprised several United States Navy bases in Australia during World War II. Australia entered World War II on 3 September 1939, being a self-governing nation within the British Empire. The United States formally entered the war on 7 December 1941 after the Japanese attack on Pearl Harbor. Following this attack Japanese forces quickly took over much of the western and central Pacific Ocean. The United States lost key naval bases including Naval Base Manila and Naval Base Subic Bay as a result of the 1941 Japanese invasion of the Philippines, along with Guam and Wake Island. The Allied forces needed new bases in the South West Pacific to stage attacks on Japan's southern empire, and these were built in Australia.

History

After the failure of the American-British-Dutch-Australian Command (ABDACOM) to defend the Malay Peninsula, Singapore and the Dutch East Indies, followed by the fall of the Philippines, Allied forces fell back to Australia.   

Japanese air attacks in 1942 and 1943 on northern Australia, particularly the bombing of Darwin on 19 February 1942, demonstrated the need for ports further south.  In addition, there were fears Japan would attempt to invade Australia. There were Japanese plans to invade Australia, but these were cancelled after the Allied strategic victory at the Battle of the Coral Sea. 

The first bases were built by Australian Allied Works Council civilian contractors and rent was paid under the Reverse Lend-Lease. Later construction of US Naval Advance Bases was performed by U.S. Navy Seabees (Naval Construction Battalions). 

By the end of the war the U.S. Navy had bases on all four shores of Australia, building facilities for ships, submarines, PT boats, seaplanes, supply depots, training camps, fleet recreation facilities, and ship repair depots. Some of the bases were shared with the Royal Australian Navy and Royal Australian Air Force. Supplies were transported by the United States Merchant Navy. By spring 1943, the build up of the U.S. Navy to support the Pacific War had caused overcrowding at the ports on the eastern coast of Australia. The Seabees departed Naval Base Brisbane on 19 June 1943 to set up a new base in Milne Bay, Papua New Guinea.  There were also U.S. naval facilities in New Zealand, but these were closed in 1944 as the fighting moved further north, followed by the closing of most of the bases in Australia after the end of the war in 1945.

Current
The U.S. Navy has only one base currently in Australia:
Naval Communication Station Harold E. Holt in Exmouth, Western Australia. . 
 There is one other non-Navy U.S. base in Australia: Pine Gap in Alice Springs, in the center of Northern Territory.

Major bases
Major World War II US Naval bases in Australia:
Naval Base Brisbane
Camp Seabee
Naval Air Station Brisbane
Hamilton repair depot
Naval Air Station Brisbane
Naval Base Sydney
Rose Bay Seaplane Base
Naval Base Darwin
Naval Base Melbourne
Naval Depot Geelong
Naval Intelligence Center Melbourne
Naval Base Perth
Fremantle submarine base
Exmouth Submarine Base

Minor bases
Minor World War II US Naval bases in Australia:
Auxiliary Albany Submarine Base
Naval Base Adelaide
Roebuck Bay Seaplane Base
Naval Air Station Palm Island
Thursday Island Submarine Base
Naval Base Palm Island
Naval Base Cairns
Townsville Naval Section Base
Horn Island Seaplane Base
Toorbul Combined Training Centre
Port Stephens amphibious landing training base
Fleet Radio Unit, Melbourne – intelligence unit
Fleet Radio Unit Radio Station Cooktown at Cooktown, Queensland. FPO# 813 SF Cooktown

Gallery

See also
Axis naval activity in Australian waters
US Naval Advance Bases
List of Royal Australian Navy bases
US Naval Base Solomons
Christmas Island

External links
youtube, Abandoned Navy Base on The Brisbane River
youtube, World War 2 – Defence of Australia

References

Naval Stations of the United States Navy
World War II airfields in the Pacific Ocean Theater
Airfields of the United States Navy
Military installations closed in the 1940s
Closed installations of the United States Navy
World War II sites in Australia